The 2021–22 P. League+ season is the inaugural season of the P. League+ (PLG). The league launched with 4 teams playing a 24-game schedule. The regular season began on December 19, 2020, and was scheduled to end on April 10, 2021. The playoffs began on April 23 and was early ended on May 15 due to the Taiwanese pandemic restrictions after Game 4 of the 2021 P. League+ Finals. The Taipei Fubon Braves, leading 3–1 in the Finals, was declared the champion after the remaining Finals games were cancelled.

Transactions

Retirement
On February 19, 2021, Chi Sung-Yu announced his retirement from professional basketball.

Coaching changes

Off-season
 On August 3, 2020, the Hsinchu JKO Lioneers hired Lin Kuan-Lun as their head coach.
 On October 13, 2020, the Taoyuan  hired Liu I-Hsiang as their head coach.

In-season
 On December 22, 2020, the Taoyuan and head coach Liu I-Hsiang mutually agreed to part ways without playing any games with the team.

Imports / Foreign Student / Heritage Player

Note 1: Heritage player refers to player of Taiwanese descent but does not have a ROC passport. 

Note 2: Team can either register 2 heritage players or 1 foreign student and 1 heritage player.

Preseason
The preseason began on October 17, and ended on November 22.

Regular season
The regular season began on December 19, 2020, and ended on April 10, 2021.

Notes
 z – Clinched home court advantage for the entire playoffs
 x – Clinched playoff spot

Playoffs

Bracket

Bold Series winner
Italic Team with home-court advantage

Statistics

Individual statistic leaders

Individual game highs

Team statistic leaders

Awards

Yearly awards

All-PLG Team:
 Chang Tsung-Hsien, Taipei Fubon Braves
 Chieng Li-Huan, Hsinchu JKO Lioneers
 Shih Chin-Yao, Taoyuan Pilots
 Yang Chin-Min, Formosa Taishin Dreamers
 Ihor Zaytsev, Taipei Fubon Braves

All-Defensive Team:
 Chieng Li-Huan, Hsinchu JKO Lioneers
 Kao Kuo-Hao, Hsinchu JKO Lioneers
 Chang Tsung-Hsien, Taipei Fubon Braves
 Lee Te-Wei, Formosa Taishin Dreamers
 Hasheem Thabeet, Hsinchu JKO Lioneers

Statistical awards

Finals

Players of the Week

Preseason

Regular season

Players of the Month

Arenas
 The Hsinchu Lioneers announced on September 8, 2020, that they would play their home games at Hsinchu County Stadium.
 The Taoyuan announced on November 14, 2020, that they would play their home games at Taoyuan Arena.
 The Formosa Dreamers scheduled last four of their home games at National Taiwan University of Sport Gymnasium. On March 15, the Dreamers resumed their last two home games back to Changhua County Stadium for Tien Lei's retiring weekend.

Media
The games will be aired on television via FTV One and MOMOTV, and will be broadcast online on YouTube Official Channel and 4gTV.

References

External links
 

 
Basketball events postponed due to the COVID-19 pandemic